Constitución is a ghost station in the Buenos Aires Underground, which was part of Line E until its closure in 1966. It is one of two ghost stations on the line, the other being San José vieja. This was the original terminus of the line when it ended at Constitución railway station and combined with Line C there.

History

The station was the original terminus of Line E when it still had its original trajectory to Constitución railway station where it combined with the General Roca Railway. However, the line was re-routed further towards the centre of the city in 1966 in order to improve the line's traffic and the station was closed along with San José vieja station on 24 April 1966.

The first tunnels heading towards the station were actually constructed in 1932 (instead of 1938 like the rest of the line) since the Hispanic-Argentine Company for Public Works and Finances (CHADOPyF) built 100m of tunnels originally intended for Line C, which were soon abandoned in favour of the line's current trajectory. When construction of Line E began in 1938, the tunnel was re-purposed as the first part of the line.

Constitución is today a ghost station, used partially as a maintenance area for the rolling stock of both Line E and Line C under the name Constitución Workshops, though the manoeuvring areas had already been used as a workshop as early as 1934 for Line C before work on Line E commenced.

Possible use on Line F

As early as 1957, the use of the station as part of a new north-south line was being considered. In 2006, it was under evaluation whether the two Line E ghost stations could be used as the southern point of Line F, considering they overlapped the line's trajectory. However, it was later decided that Line F would use a completely new tunnel with new stations given the frequency the line is expected to have.

See also
 San José vieja - Ghost station on the same line
 Pasco Sur - Ghost station on Line A
 Alberti Norte - Ghost station on Line A

References

External links

Buenos Aires Underground ghost stations
Railway stations opened in 1944
Railway stations closed in 1966
1944 establishments in Argentina